Prostanthera tallowa is a species of flowering plant in the family Lamiaceae and is endemic to the Kangaroo Valley area of New South Wales. It is an erect, aromatic shrub with narrow egg-shaped to linear leaves and mauve to light purple flowers with darker dots inside the petal tube.

Description
Flowering mainly occurs from December to February.

Taxonomy
Prostanthera tallowa was first formally described in 2012 by Barry Conn and Trevor Wilson in the journal Telopea from specimens collected in Morton National Park near Tallowa Dam in 1988. The specific epithet (tallowa) is a reference to Tallowa Dam.

Distribution and habitat
This mintbush is only known from near the type location where it grows in open Eucalyptus forest on rocky soils derived from sandstone.

References

tallowa
Flora of New South Wales
Lamiales of Australia
Taxa named by Barry John Conn
Plants described in 2012